National LGBTI Day or National Gender and Sexual Minorities' Day  is an annual celebration of LGBTIs in Nepal. The day marks the first legal victory of LGBTI people in Nepal.

History
In Nepal, LGBTI individuals are in high closet and discrimination is prevalent. The LGBTI rights movement started in Nepal since 2001 by establishment on Blue Diamond Society, an LGBTI rights NGO. The NGO filed a case against the government of Nepal and the law. On 21 December 2007 the Supreme Court ruled that the new democratic government must create laws to protect LGBT rights and change existing laws that are tantamount to discrimination. The day falls on 6th Paush according to Bikram Sambat. And this day is annually celebrated by LGBTI organizations remembering this landmark milestone.

References

LGBT events in Nepal
Parades in Nepal
2001 establishments in Nepal